The Willis family are a fictional family from the Australian soap opera Neighbours. They were introduced by Don Battye in 1989, but left screens in 1996, before being reintroduced in 2013. The first family member to be seen on-screen was Brad Willis, who appeared in a guest capacity from October 1989, and then his sister Cody from November. The family became a more permanent fixture with the arrival of patriarch Doug Willis and his wife Pam, who moved onto Ramsay Street the following year. Cody was the last family member to regularly appear in the show until her on-screen death in 1996, which brought Pam back briefly to bury her daughter.

In 2013 Richard Jasek reintroduced a grown-up Brad with a new family; wife Terese, and twin teenagers Josh and Imogen. Doug and Pam returned in guest capacities, while Brad's long lost child Paige Smith joined the family a year later, and Brad and Terese's youngest daughter Piper arriving in 2015. The family was completed by Brad's eldest son Ned Willis in 2016, who arrived the same week that both Josh and Doug were killed off in "Hotel Death Trap Week", in which Lassiter's Hotel exploded.

Family members

 Bert Willis
 Doug Willis, son of Bert; married Pam Beresford
 Adam Willis, son of Doug and Pam; married Gemma Ramsay
 Roxy Willis, daughter of Adam and Gemma; married Kyle Canning
 John Willis, son of Doug and Pam
 Brad Willis, son of Doug and Pam; married Beth Brennan, Terese Petrides and Lauren Carpenter
 Ned Willis, son of Brad and Beth
 Paige Smith, daughter of Brad and Lauren; married Mark Brennan
Gabriel Smith, son of Paige and Jack Callahan
Freddie Brennan, son of Paige and Mark
 Josh Willis, son of Brad and Terese
 Matilda Turner, daughter of Josh and Amber Turner
 Imogen Willis, daughter of Brad and Terese; married Daniel Robinson
 Piper Willis, daughter of Brad and Terese
 Gaby Willis, daughter of Doug and Pam 
  Zac Willis, son of Gaby and Jack Flynn
 Cody Willis, daughter of Doug and Pam
 Faye Hudson, daughter of Bert; married Kevin Hudson
  Cameron Hudson, son of Faye and Kevin

Brad Willis

Bradley "Brad" Willis made his first screen appearance during the episode broadcast on 31 October 1989. He was initially played by Benjamin Mitchell, before Scott Michaelson took over the role two years later. Brad was re-introduced alongside his sister, Gaby (Rachel Blakely), during a period of roller coaster ratings for the show. A reporter for the Herald Sun called Brad "one of the show's most popular characters" and commented that Michaelson had a huge following because of his "blonde surfer looks." For his portrayal of Brad, Michaelson earned a nomination for Most Popular Actor at the 1993 Logie Awards. Kip Gamblin took over the role in June 2013 when Brad and his family returned to the show.

Cody Willis

Cody Willis, played by Amelia Frid, made her first on-screen appearance on 24 November 1989. Frid successfully auditioned for the role of Cody and she called the experience a "right time, right place thing", she also added that "it was all kind of surreal." Cody became the second member of the Willis family to arrive in Ramsay Street and she dates both Josh Anderson (Jeremy Angerson) and Todd Landers' (Kristian Schmid). Cody is described as a "studious girl".

Doug Willis

Douglas "Doug" Willis , played by Terence Donovan, made his first screen appearance on 1 August 1990. Doug is described as being a "bit of a Regular Joe who didn't like rocking the boat or standing out from the crowd." He is also "a man's man" who is not afraid of using his fists and takes great pleasure from making home-brewed beer with Lou Carpenter (Tom Oliver). A writer for the BBC said Doug's most notable moment was "Having an affair with Jill Weir." Donovan made a brief return for the show's 20th anniversary celebrations in July 2005.

Pam Willis

Pamela "Pam" Willis (previously Beresford), played by Sue Jones, made her first screen appearance during the episode broadcast on 6 August 1990. Jones was cast in the role following a screen test. Pam is characterised by her helpful personality, she loves her four children and continually tries to help them out. Pam extended her caring nature through her time on the show working as a nurse. Josephine Monroe praised Pam in her book Neighbours: The first 10 years stating: "A real salt-of-the-earth-type. Pam could always be relied on to help out, especially if it benefited one of her four children." The BBC said Pam's most notable moment was "Kicking Doug out of the house after having he told her about his affair with Jill Weir."

Adam Willis

Adam Willis, played by Ian Williams, made his first appearance on 9 August 1990. Williams was invited to play the role of Adam shortly after he appeared in Bony, another Grundy production. Williams said the part appealed to him as it was flexible and Adam's humour kept him "fired up." Williams explained that he felt similar to his character as they both loved their families, but he was not impressed with Adam's naivety. The BBC said Adam's most notable moment was "Chauffeuring a Lassiter's client while wearing a toga."

Gaby Willis

Gabrielle "Gaby" Willis, played by Rachel Blakely made her first on-screen appearance 12 August 1991. A highly ambitious woman who works in the Robinson Corporation, though her aggressive nature is somewhat tempered after she gives birth to son Zac. Gaby becomes the proprietor of the upmarket boutique "Gabrielle's" until her departure in 1994. In 2005, Blakely was one of over twenty ex-cast members who returned to Neighbours to appear in Annalise Hartman's documentary film about Ramsay Street.

Cameron Hudson

Cameron Hudson, played by Benjamin Grant Mitchell, made his first appearance on 24 March 1992. Mitchell had recently finished appearing in the Victorian State Opera's production of The Wizard of Oz.
Cameron is the son of Faye Hudson (Lorraine Bayly), who arrives in Ramsay Street in to defend his aunt Pam Willis (Sue Jones) who is accused of murdering Garth Kirby (Roy Baldwin). Cameron is able to prove Pam's innocence successfully. Cameron repairs his fraught relationship with Faye and moves in with her at Number 32. After Faye moves out, Cameron invites Beth Brennan (Natalie Imbruglia) to move in with him. Cameron becomes involved with Jacqueline Summers (Tiffany Lamb) after he helps her on a case but the relationship ends when he finds that he could be facing legal proceedings for becoming involved with a client and when Jacqueline realises he is not completely convinced of her innocence in the case.

Cameron later finds himself offside with the Martin family when he defends Raymond Chambers (Greg Parker) who is accused of trying to abduct Hannah (Rebecca Ritters). Despite Chambers' ex-wife mentioning that he had previously tried to kidnap their daughter in Hong Kong and eyewitness testimony from Toby Mangel (Ben Geurens), Chambers is acquitted, furthering Cameron's stress and he begins to doubt himself as a lawyer. When Cameron intervenes in a confrontation between Chambers and Toby, He is even more convinced of Chambers' guilt and when Cameron arrives home, he finds Chambers' waiting for him in the dark and he blames Cameron for his life being ruined. Cameron forces Chambers to get help and after he breaks down in tears, Chambers hands himself in to the police and confesses to the abduction. The Martins apologise for their treatment of Cameron.

After Helen Daniels (Anne Haddy) wants to rent Number 32 to the Martins, Cameron and Beth move in with Lou Carpenter (Tom Oliver). During this, Cameron does some investigating and discovers Gavin Heywood (Peter Hosking) is involved in some shady business. When Heywood catches Cameron, He has him roughed up by some thugs and is about to have him thrown down a lift shaft. Cameron offers to work for Heywood to prevent being killed and uses this to gain more information. Heywood then begins involving members of Cameron's family in his business.

Cameron's life is endangered again when he overhears Heywood and his associate Noddy (Richard Piper) plot to kill him but he engineers a plan which results in Heywood's downfall. Cameron then changes career track and becomes a journalist for the Erinsborough news but is frustrated and surprises everyone with his next career choice, stand-up comedy.

When Lou's daughter, Lauren (Sarah Vandenberg) arrives from Queensland, Cameron is smitten with her but does not know she is having an affair with Cameron's cousin, Brad (Scott Michaelson). In order to ward off Cameron's suspicions, Lauren agrees to go out with him. The truth later emerges and Cameron leaves Erinsborough in disgust.

Bert Willis

Bert Willis, played by Bud Tingwell, made his first screen appearance on 18 February 1993. Bert is Doug (Terence Donovan) and Faye's (Lorraine Bayly) father. He walked out on his wife and children when they were young, leading to a falling out with Doug that lasted for many years. Bert's granddaughter, Gaby (Rachel Blakely), got in touch with him and they began a correspondence. She and her mother later invited Bert to stay with them, although Doug was against the idea. An Inside Soap writer commented "He won't tell them what the problem is, and they think that whatever it is, they can re-build the relationship. But they've got to work fast because times's not on their side."

Bert is asked to come and stay with his family in Erinsborough by his granddaughter Gaby. Bert tries to explain and apologise to his son, Doug, for walking out on him and the family. However, Doug is unable to forgive his and asks that he leave. While speaking to Wayne Duncan (Jonathan Sammy Lee), Bert reveals that he is dying and Wayne realises that he came to make amends before he died. He eventually tells Doug about Bert's condition and Doug manages to stop his father from leaving on a boat, before making up with him. Bert is grateful to Wayne for his part in the reunion with Doug. He tells Gaby that his dying wish is to see her and Wayne get together as a couple.

The episode featuring Bert's revelation about his terminal cancer was nominated for the Australian Film Institute Award for Best Episode in a Television Drama Serial in 1993.

Reception
During a feature on Neighbours, Anna Pickard of The Guardian tried to choose the characters she would be most starstruck by if she met them. She said "It would have to be the Willis family. All of them. Pam, Doug, Adam, Gaby, Brad and Cody".

References

 

 
Neighbours families
Television characters introduced in 1989